Ecleora is a genus of moths in the family Geometridae.

Species
Ecleora brandti (Wehrli, 1941)
Ecleora haroldaria (Oberthur, 1913)
Ecleora solieraria (Rambur, 1834)

References

External links
 Ecleora at Markku Savela's Lepidoptera and Some Other Life Forms
 Natural History Museum Lepidoptera genus database

Boarmiini
Geometridae genera